John Burke (born 10 August 1962) is a Scottish footballer, who played as a full back in the Football League for Exeter City and Chester City.

References

Chester City F.C. players
1962 births
Living people
Sheffield United F.C. players
Exeter City F.C. players
Larkhall Thistle F.C. players
English Football League players
Association football fullbacks
Scottish footballers
Footballers from Motherwell